Tampon Run is a 2014 endless running video game about tampons created by Andrea Gonzales and Sophie Houser. It started as a web game made available in 2014 and released on iOS in February 2015.

Gameplay
At the start of Tampon Run the game explains that de-stigmatizing menstruation is important. The player then controls a character who runs through the level throwing tampons at enemies and collecting more by jumping for boxes. Bumping into enemies causes the loss of some tampons; the game ends if the player runs out.

Development

The game was created by Andrea Gonzales and Sophie Houser, two high school students from New York City, who started developing the game during a Girls Who Code camp. The pair designed the concept as a response to feeling like they couldn't openly discuss menstruation and wanted to create a game which could have a social impact. They cite Wendy Davis' 2013 filibuster as inspiration for the game.

The first version of Tampon Run was built in a week and a half at Girls Who Code. The game was then developed further afterwards and made available online in 2014, subsequently being released on iOS in February 2015. Software development company Pivotal Labs worked with Gonzales and Houser to develop the iOS app, and over seven weeks the team added leaderboards, new enemies, achievements, and other features to the game.

By May 2015 the game had been played 300,000 times across the web and app versions.

References

External links

2014 video games
Browser games
IOS games
Endless runner games
Video games developed in the United States